Yuri Nikolayevich Savichev  (born 13 February 1965) is a Russian former professional footballer who played as a forward. He is an identical twin brother of Nikolai Savichev and an uncle of Daniil Savichev.

Club career
Savichev was born in Moscow.

International career
Savichev played for the Soviet Union national team at the 1988 Olympic Games, where Savichev struck the winning goal during extra-time in the 103rd minute of the final against Romário's Brazil. He made his debut for USSR on 19 October 1988 in a 1990 FIFA World Cup qualifier against Austria. He was not selected for the final tournament squad.

Honours
Torpedo Moscow
 Soviet Cup: 1986
 Soviet Top League bronze: 1988

Olympiacos
 Greek Football Cup: 1992

Soviet Union
 Olympic champion: 1988

Individual
 Top 33 players year-end list: 1986, 1987, 1988, 1989
 Member of the Grigory Fedotov club

References

External links
Yuri Savichev – career abroad
Profile 
Seoul 1988 Men's Olympic Football tournament

1965 births
Living people
Footballers from Moscow
Soviet footballers
Soviet Union international footballers
Russian footballers
FC Torpedo Moscow players
Olympiacos F.C. players
1. FC Saarbrücken players
FC St. Pauli players
Soviet Top League players
Super League Greece players
Bundesliga players
2. Bundesliga players
Association football forwards
Olympic footballers of the Soviet Union
Olympic gold medalists for the Soviet Union
Footballers at the 1988 Summer Olympics
Olympic medalists in football
Medalists at the 1988 Summer Olympics
Russian twins
Twin sportspeople
FC FShM Torpedo Moscow players
Russian football managers
Soviet expatriate footballers
Russian expatriate footballers
Russian expatriate football managers
Soviet expatriate sportspeople in Greece
Expatriate footballers in Greece
Russian expatriate sportspeople in Germany
Expatriate footballers in Germany